The 2013–14 season of the Oberliga was the sixth season of the Oberligas at tier five of the German football league system and the 40th season overall since reintroduction of the Oberligas in 1974. The regular season started in July 2013 and finished in May 2014.

The Oberliga is organised in fourteen regional divisions with the league champions promoted to the level above, the Regionalligas while the relegated teams drop down to the Verbandsligas and Landesligas.

Overview

The 2013–14 season saw 245 clubs compete in fourteen Oberliga divisions. Of the fourteen league champions eight were promoted to the Regionalliga while four declined promotion. One club, Bremer SV, missed out on promotion in the play-off round while Arminia Bielefeld II was ineligible for promotion because the first team of the club was relegated to the 3. Liga and reserve teams of 3. Liga clubs can not play in the Regionalliga. Two of the league champions who declined promotion, BC Aichach and TGM SV Jügesheim, completely withdrew from the Oberliga to compete at a lower level in 2014–15.

Of the fourteen league champions VfB Lübeck was arguably the most outstanding, winning 31 of their 34 season games and drawing the other three, thereby remaining undefeated all season. BFC Dynamo was the only other undefeated team, winning 27 and also drawing three. Lübeck also had the best defence, conceding only 17 goals all season and the second-best attack with 116 goals scored, four less than Bremer SV. PSV Wesel-Lackhausen had the worst defence of all Oberliga clubs, conceding 130 goals. While no club went winless all season a number achieved only two wins all season.

Four Oberliga runners-up and one third placed team were also promoted to the Regionalliga. FC Nöttingen and FT Braunschweig did so after success in a promotion round while SV Rödinghausen was automatically promoted as the Oberliga Westfalen runners-up and VfR Garching and FC Kray took up the promotion spot their league champions had declined. No club was promoted from the Bremen-Liga, Oberliga Hamburg and Hessenliga.

At the other end of the table, 38 clubs were relegated from the Oberligas while six voluntarily withdrew to compete at a lower level. Four more teams, all reserve sides, were completely withdrawn from competition. All up, 48 clubs dropped out of the league.

The most goals scored by any player in the Oberligas were by Iranian-German Iman Bi-Ria who scored 48 goals for Bremer SV in the Bremen-Liga.

2013–14 season
The 2013–14 league champions, promoted and relegated teams, the league strength (S), the top scorer and the number of goals they scored:

 ‡ Denotes club declined promotion.
 † Denotes club withdrew from league.
 ¶ Denotes club failed to win promotion.
 # Denotes club was inelegible for promotion.

Promotion play-offs
Promotion play-offs were held at the end of the season to the Regionalliga Südwest, Regionalliga Bayern and Regionalliga Nord:

Regionalliga Südwest
The runners-up of the Hessenliga, Oberliga Rheinland-Pfalz/Saar and the Oberliga Baden-Württemberg were scheduled to play each other for one more spot in the Regionalliga. The Hessenliga runners-up declined this opportunity leaving just two teams to play off, with FC Nöttingen winning promotion to the Regionalliga:

Regionalliga Bayern

First round
The 15th and 16th placed Regionalliga teams played the runners-up of the northern division, TSV Aubstadt, and the third placed team in the south, FC Pipinsried. Both Bayernliga teams failed to earn promotion while 1. FC Schweinfurt 05 retained its league place and TSV 1860 Rosenheim was relegated:
First leg

Second leg

Rosenheim won 3−2 on aggregate.

Schweinfurt won 7−3 on aggregate.

Second round
The winners of the first round play each other for the one available spot in the Regionalliga:
First leg

Second leg

Schweinfurt won 6–1 on aggregate.

Regionalliga Nord
The champions of the Bremen-Liga and the Schleswig-Holstein-Liga as well as the runners-up from the Niedersachsenliga entered a play-off for two more spots in the Regionalliga Nord. The champions of the Oberliga Hamburg declined participation. VfB Lübeck and FT Braunschweig were promoted while Bremer SV failed to win promotion:

References

External links
 Fussball.de  Official results website of the German Football Association
 Weltfussball.de  German football results and tables
 Scoresway.com Oberliga tables and results

 
5
Germ